Un oso rojo ("Red Bear" or "A Red Bear") is a 2002 Argentine, Spanish, and French neo-Western action drama film directed by Israel Adrián Caetano.

The film was produced by Lita Stantic, and the screenplay was written by Caetano and Graciela Speranza, from the story penned by Romina Lafranchini. The picture features Julio Chávez, Soledad Villamil, Luis Machín, and Agostina Lage, among others.

In a survey of the 100 greatest films of Argentine cinema carried out by the Museo del Cine Pablo Ducrós Hicken in 2000, the film reached the 38th position.

Plot
Oso (Julio Chávez) is sent to prison for a robbery and a murder. After seven years, he is released from prison, and in a flashback, the robbery is seen that led to his arrest.  His daughter, Alicia (Agostina Lage), was a year old on the day of the robbery. As a consequence, Alicia never got a chance to get to know her father.

Oso returns to his hometown, a depressed suburb of Buenos Aires, fully aware that his wife, Natalia (Soledad Villamil), is living with another man, Sergio (Luis Machín). Oso is determined to establish a relationship with Alicia, and to collect money owed him by a sleazy crime boss known as the Turkish (René Lavand). In the meantime, the Turkish wants Oso to be the getaway driver on one last big job. For her part, Alicia seems fascinated with her father and makes him promise never to go away again.

Cast
 Julio Chávez as Rubén (Oso)
 Soledad Villamil as Natalia
 Luis Machín as Sergio
 Agostina Lage as Alicia
 Enrique Liporace as Güemes
 René Lavand as Turco
 Daniel Valenzuela as Alfarito
 Freddy Flores as Truck
 Marcos Martínez as Ramón

Distribution
The film was first featured at the Cannes Film Festival on May 23, 2002. It opened in Argentina on October 3, 2002, making the picture Caetano's second film that opened in Argentina in 2002 (the last was Bolivia in April).

The film was also shown at various film festivals, including: the Gothenburg Film Festival, Sweden; the Havana Film Festival, Cuba; the Latin America Film Festival, Poland; the Lleida Latin-American Film Festival, Spain; the Cartagena Film Festival, Colombia; the Film by the Sea Film Festival, Netherlands; and the Helsinki International Film Festival, Finland.

In the United States, the picture opened at the Sundance Film Festival on January 17, 2003. It also screened at the New Directors/New Films Festival, New York City in March 2003, and the Milwaukee International Film Festival and Los Angeles in October 2004.

Critical reception
Film critic Neil Young thought the film was an engaging mix of crime thriller and family drama, and wrote, "[The film] is nevertheless an effective, if minor, foray into a dusty, neglected corner of modern-day Buenos Aires. We can feel Argentina's well-documented financial problems starting to sour the whole country's atmosphere, exerting unbearable pressures on the likes of Sergio, Oso and Natalia."  Young also thought director Caetano elicited solid work from his actors.

A.O. Scott, film critic for The New York Times, also liked the film and wrote, "Its combination of toughness and smooth, understated style makes it touching and absorbing..."

And journalist Diego Batlle, who writes for the Argentine daily La Nación wrote, "Un oso rojo imposes itself as a piece of great dramatic power that ratifies a prolific director's narrative talent."

Awards
Wins
 Argentine Film Critics Association Awards : Silver Condor Award; Best Actor, Julio Chávez; 2003
 Lleida Latin-American Film Festival : Best Actor, Julio Chávez; 2003
 Havana Film Festival : Best Music, Diego Grimblat; Special Jury Prize, Adrián Caetano; Special Mention, Lita Stantic; 2002
 
Nominations
 Cartagena Film Festival : Golden India Catalina; Best Film, Adrián Caetano; 2004
 Argentine Film Critics Association Awards: Silver Condor Award; Best Actress, Soledad Villamil; Best Art Direction, Graciela Oderigo; Best Cinematography, Willi Behnisch; Best Director, Adrián Caetano; Best Editing, Santiago Ricci; Best Film; Best Music, Diego Grimblat; Best New Actor, René Lavand; Best New Actress, Agostina Lage; Best Original Screenplay, Adrián Caetano and Gabriela Speranza; Best Sound, Marcos De Aguirre; 2003

References

External links
 
 
 
 Un oso rojo at cinenacional.com 
 

2002 films
2002 drama films
Films directed by Israel Adrián Caetano
Argentine independent films
2000s Spanish-language films
French independent films
Spanish independent films
2000s French films
2002 independent films
Spanish-language French films